Lysipomia tubulosa is a species of flowering plant in the family Campanulaceae. It is endemic to Ecuador. It has only been collected twice, most recently over 60 years ago. It is known from forest and páramo habitat in the high Andes. It is threatened by habitat destruction.

References

tubulosa
Endemic flora of Ecuador
Endangered plants
Páramo flora
Taxonomy articles created by Polbot